Roger III may refer to:
 Roger III, Duke of Apulia (1118–1148)
 Roger III of Sicily (1175–1193), King of Sicily